Standard Theatre or Standard Theater may refer to:

in Australia
Royal Standard Theatre, in Sydney, known as "Standard Theatre", since demolished 

in Canada;
 Standard Theatre (Toronto, Ontario)

in the United States
Standard Theatre, early name of the Manhattan Theatre, New York
Standard Theatre (Kansas City, Missouri), also known as Folly Theatre, listed on the NRHP in Missouri
Standard Theatre (Philadelphia), a venue showcasing black performers and jazz musicians 1888–1931, then a movie theater